Buryak (Ukrainian, Russian: Буря́к) is a Ukrainian surname that may refer to:

 Borys Buryak (born 1953), Ukrainian painter
 Dmitry Buryak (born 1987), Russian sprinter
 Ihor Buryak (born 1983), Ukrainian footballer
 Leonid Buryak (born 1953), Soviet and Ukrainian footballer and coach
 Zoya Buryak (born 1966), Russian actress